Robert Stafford was the Member of Parliament for Staffordshire in  1378, 1380, 1382 and 1383.

References

14th-century births
Year of death missing
Robert
14th-century English people
Year of birth missing
Place of birth missing
Place of death missing
Politicians from Staffordshire
English MPs 1378
English MPs January 1380
English MPs May 1382
English MPs February 1383